Woodland Plantation, in West Pointe à la Hache, Louisiana, is a historic building and a former plantation house. It is located at 21997 Louisiana Highway 23 in West Pointe à la Hache, in Plaquemines Parish, Louisiana. This plantation was once worked by enslaved people. It has been listed on the National Register of Historic Places since June 18, 1998.

Woodland Plantation is depicted in A Home on the Mississippi, an 1871 lithograph; which later was licensed for use on the label of Southern Comfort after Prohibition ended. Privately owned, the location has most recently operated as a bed and breakfast.

In popular culture
Since the 1930s, the image on the label of Southern Comfort has been a rendering by Alfred Waud of Currier & Ives' A Home on the Mississippi, depicting Woodland Plantation. In 2010, Southern Comfort was rebranded and the company dropped the plantation image from the label.

Celebrity guests have included Jason Statham, Rosie Huntington-Whiteley, and Snoop Dogg.

References

Houses on the National Register of Historic Places in Louisiana
Plantation houses in Louisiana
Houses in Plaquemines Parish, Louisiana
Houses completed in 1855
National Register of Historic Places in Plaquemines Parish, Louisiana
1855 establishments in Louisiana